Triphassa bilineata is a moth of the family Pyralidae first described by Frederic Moore in 1887. It was first found in Sri Lanka.

References

Pyralinae
Moths of Asia
Moths described in 1887